This is a list of music archivists.

Music archivists 

 Santiago Álvarez
 Alan Leeds
 Alan Lomax
 David Marks
 Todd Matshikiza
 Eleanor Mlotek
 Einojuhani Rautavaara
 Arthur Warren Darley
 Tiny Tim

See also 
 List of sound archives
 List of archivists

 
Archivists